Chalcatongo de Hidalgo (also, Chalcatongo and Villa Hidalgo) is a municipality in the Mexican state of Oaxaca. It is part of the Tlaxiaco District in the south of the Mixteca Region.

It is the birthplace of former Governor Ulises Ruiz Ortiz.

References

Municipalities of Oaxaca